The 1952 Australian Grand Prix was a Formula Libre motor race held at the Mount Panorama Circuit near Bathurst, in New South Wales, Australia on 14 April 1952. The race had 43 starters and was held over 38 laps of the six kilometre circuit, a total distance of 235 kilometres. A crowd of 15,000 watched the race, which was organised by the Australian Sporting Car Club.

The race, which was recognised by the Confederation of Australian Motor Sport as the seventeenth Australian Grand Prix, was won by Doug Whiteford driving a Talbot-Lago T26C Formula One car. It was Whiteford's second Australian Grand Prix victory.

Classification 
Results as follows.

Note: Competitors still running when the winner completed the race were allowed to continue racing until the race time limit flag was shown. Nine cars completed the full race distance and a further eight were "flagged off".

Notes 
 Starters: 43
 Winner's average speed: 76 mph
 Fastest lap: Doug Whiteford – 3'02
 Fastest speed through quarter-mile:  Stan Jones (Maybach), 141.8 mph

Handicap
The race incorporated a concurrent handicap award which was won by Harry Monday (Mercury Special), 12 seconds ahead of Doug Whiteford. Minor placings were taken by Bill Murray, Clive Adams and David McKay.

This was to be the last Australian Grand Prix to include a handicap section.

References & notes

External links
 Whiteford Wins Grand Prix Again, Sydney Morning Herald, Tuesday 15 April 1952, page 1 - via trove.nla.gov.au
 1952 Australian Grand Prix, Bathurst, www.youtube.com

Grand Prix
Australian Grand Prix
Motorsport in Bathurst, New South Wales
Australian Grand Prix